Eolophotes is an extinct genus of Lampridiformes.

External links
 Eolophotes at the Paleobiology Database

Lampriformes